Ziaur Rahman Khan (1945/6 – 24 April 2021) was a Bangladesh Nationalist Party politician, lawyer and a Jatiya Sangsad member representing the Dhaka-13 constituency.

Early life 
Khan was born in Balia village of Dhamrai upazila of Dhaka district. His father Ataur Rahman Khan was the Chief Minister of East Pakistan in 1956 and the Prime Minister of Bangladesh in 1984.

Career
Barrister Ziaur Rahman Khan was a senior lawyer in the Bangladesh Supreme Court. He was elected to parliament from at that time Dhaka-13 as a Bangladesh Nationalist Party candidate in 1991, 15 February 1996, 12 June 1996 and 2001.

Ziaur Rahman Khan was defeated from Dhaka-20 constituency as a candidate of Bangladesh Nationalist Party in the ninth parliamentary elections of 2008 and the 11th parliamentary elections of 2018.

References

1940s births
2021 deaths
People from Dhaka District
20th-century Pakistani lawyers
Bangladesh Nationalist Party politicians
5th Jatiya Sangsad members
6th Jatiya Sangsad members
7th Jatiya Sangsad members
8th Jatiya Sangsad members
Deaths from the COVID-19 pandemic in Bangladesh
20th-century Bangladeshi lawyers